Tri-Danielson!!! (Alpha) is an album by the New Jersey indie rock band Danielson Famile, released in 1998. Part of the album was recorded at Ventnor Methodist Church, in Ventnor City, New Jersey.

Track listing
 "Tri-Danielson!!!" – 0:21
 "Southern Paws" – 2:57
 "Rubber-Necker" – 1:46
 "Body English" – 2:07
 "Runnin' to Brother" – 3:00
 "Between the Lines of the Scout Signs" – 1:36
 "A Meeting with Your Maker" – 3:36
 "Gorgeous New Age" – 3:07
 "Pottymouth" – 3:33
 "The Elderly + The Little Ones Unite in Song + Dance" – 6:15
 "Holy Kisser's Block Party" – 3:51
 "Flesh" – 1:44
 "Lord Did You Hear Harrison" – 5:04

References

Danielson Famile albums
1998 albums
Tooth & Nail Records albums